Donald J. Cazayoux Jr. (born January 17, 1964) is an American lawyer and former politician. He served as the United States Attorney for the Middle District of Louisiana from 2010 to 2013. From 2008 to 2009, he was a Democratic United States Representative from Louisiana's 6th congressional district.

He won a special election held on May 3, 2008, to fill the seat vacated on Republican Congressman Richard H. Baker. He defeated Republican nominee Woody Jenkins and was sworn in on May 6, 2008. In the regularly-scheduled general election held later that year, Cazayoux ran for re-election but was defeated by the Republican nominee, State Senator Bill Cassidy.

Early life
A native of New Roads, Cazayoux is the son of Donald J. and Ann Cazayoux. His paternal grandparents were Jules Joseph Cazayoux Jr. (1914–2010), who was employed by the Southern Cotton Oil Company, and the late Ida Belle Glynn Cazayoux. A Roman Catholic, he graduated from the Catholic High School of Pointe Coupee in 1982. He earned his Bachelor of Arts degree from Louisiana State University in Baton Rouge and a Juris Doctor from Georgetown University in Washington, D.C. After finishing his studies, Cazayoux practiced law and then became a prosecutor for Pointe Coupee Parish. As an assistant district attorney under the 18th Judicial Court District Attorney, Richard "Ricky" Ward, Cazayoux never lost a jury trial.

Political career

Louisiana Legislature

Cazayoux was first elected to the state legislature in 1999. He represented District 18, a heavily Democratic district that includes his home in Pointe Coupee Parish as well as Iberville, West Baton Rouge, and West Feliciana parishes. In the legislature, he became one of the few freshmen ever appointed to the powerful Appropriations Committee. He also worked for passage of laws to assist law enforcement in cracking down on child sexual predators.

U.S. House of Representatives

Cazayoux announced his candidacy for the 6th District shortly after Baker resigned. With the strong backing of the national party, he easily defeated fellow state representative Michael L. Jackson, who represents a portion of Baton Rouge, in the Democratic primary.

Cazayoux was the first Democrat to represent the 6th since four-term incumbent John Rarick was defeated in the 1974 Democratic primary. The seat was won that fall by Republican Henson Moore, who held it for twelve years before giving way to Baker in 1987.

Cazayoux lost his attempt for a full term in November 2008 to State Senator Bill Cassidy, who took 48 percent of the vote to Cazayoux's 40 percent. Jackson ran again, this time as an independent with funding from long-time Cassidy supporter Lane Grigsby. He finished third, garnering 36,133 votes, more than the 25,000-vote margin between Cassidy and Cazayoux, suggesting that he siphoned off many African-American votes that would have otherwise gone to Cazayoux and threw the election to Cassidy. The Daily Kingfish published photos of Jackson meeting with Congressman-elect Cassidy just three days after the election. Cazayoux was one of five incumbent House Democrats to be defeated in the 2008 congressional elections, along with Nancy Boyda (D-KS), William J. Jefferson (D-LA), Nick Lampson (D-TX), and Tim Mahoney (D-FL).

Cazayoux's 2008 campaign was endorsed by Democrats for Life of America.

Political positions
Cazayoux is considered a moderate-to-conservative Democrat, which is typical for most Louisiana Democrats outside New Orleans. He strongly opposes abortion and gun control.

He also supports expanding SCHIP, and favors withdrawing U.S. forces from Iraq. He calls himself "a John Breaux Democrat."

Career after Congress
In April 2010, U.S. President Barack Obama nominated Cazayoux as United States Attorney for the Middle District of Louisiana, following a recommendation by U.S. Senator Mary Landrieu from May 2009. Cazayoux was unanimously confirmed by the United States Senate for the position on June 22, 2010. After stepping down as U.S. Attorney for the Middle District of Louisiana, Cazayoux announced the opening of the Cazayoux Ewing law offices in Baton Rouge and New Roads. Lane Ewing, a former assistant U.S. Attorney, is partnering with Cazayoux, who has also tapped former longtime assistant U.S. Attorney Stan Lemelle to join the firm. In 2014, Cazayoux retired after a 35-year career as a prosecutor and co-founded the law firm Cazayoux Ewing, with offices in Baton Rouge and New Roads.

Personal life
Cazayoux is a former president of the New Roads branch of the Lions Club (2002–2003). He and his wife, Cherie (married 1986), have three children, Michael, Chavanne, and Katie. Cazayoux is a distant relative of the late Lindy Boggs, former US Representative and US Ambassador.

See also
 2008 Louisiana's 6th congressional district special election
 United States House of Representatives elections in Louisiana, 2008#District 6

References

External links
 

 

|-

|-

|-

1964 births
20th-century American lawyers
21st-century American lawyers
21st-century American politicians
Cajun people
Democratic Party members of the United States House of Representatives from Louisiana
Georgetown University Law Center alumni
Living people
Louisiana State University alumni
Louisiana lawyers
Democratic Party members of the Louisiana House of Representatives
People from New Roads, Louisiana
United States Attorneys for the Middle District of Louisiana